Włoszyca Lubańska  is a village in the administrative district of Gmina Lubanie, within Włocławek County, Kuyavian-Pomeranian Voivodeship, in north-central Poland.

The village has a population of 280.

References

Villages in Włocławek County